USS Stonewall is a name used more than once by the United States Navy:

 , a schooner captured by the Union Navy and placed in service as a ship's tender.
 , a tanker built in 1921 at Alameda, California, by the Bethlehem Steel Company.

United States Navy ship names